V344 Carinae is a single star in the southern constellation of Carina. It has the Bayer designation f Carinae, while V344 Carinae is its variable star designation. This star has a blue-white hue and is visible to the naked eye with an apparent visual magnitude that fluctuates around 4.50. Historically, it was mentioned in the Almagest, suggesting that some time around 130 BCE it was brighter than its current magnitude. This object is located at a distance of approximately 610 light-years from the Sun based on parallax. The star is drifting further away with a radial velocity of around +27 km/s.

This is a B-type main-sequence star with a stellar classification of B3V(n). It is a Be star; a rapidly rotating star that is hosting a circumstellar disk of hot, decreted gas. It is a photometrically variable Be star, having a brightness that ranges from 4.4 down to 4.51 in visual magnitude, and has been classified as a Gamma Cassiopeiae variable. The star is 32 million years old and is spinning with a projected rotational velocity of 268 km/s. It has seven times the mass of the Sun and around 3.0 times the Sun's radius.

References

B-type main-sequence stars
Be stars
Gamma Cassiopeiae variable stars

Carina (constellation)
Carinae, f
Durchmusterung objects
075311
043105
3498
Carinae, V344